The Mining Research and Development Establishment was a British government mining research centre in south Derbyshire. It is now a commercial business park.

History
The Mining Research Establishment in west London was formed in 1951. It merged with the Central Engineering Establishment to form the MRDE in 1969.

Awards
It won the Queens Award for Technological Achievement in 1991 for its extraction drum for dust and frictional ignition control.

Structure
The site was on the south side of the A511 in the south of Derbyshire.

See also
 Coal Research Establishment

References

Coal mining in the United Kingdom
Engineering research institutes
Mining engineering
Mining organizations
Science and technology in Derbyshire
South Derbyshire District